Zhou Bing (born 1 April 1968) is a Chinese documentary director. He holds a PhD from the College of History at Nankai University. Zhou has been named "Best Documentary Film Director"  three times and has created over 100 documentaries and other productions. His works include Palace, Dun Huang, and Road of Millennia Bodhi. All three aired on CCTV, National Geographic, SKY TV, the History Channel, Arte, and NDR. Currently, he runs the Beijing Oriental Elites Culture Development Co. Ltd and works with Tiong Hiew King, the Datuk of Tan Sri, Malaysia, at Sun Media International Co. Ltd. and Zero Media International Co. Ltd. Throughout his career, Zhou has attempted to combine the industrialized process of documentary film making with the identity of independent directors. Zhou is also an adjunct professor in the Department of Media and Communication at the City University of Hong Kong. Zhou aspires to broadcast Chinese culture to the world through photographs and images.

Biography 
 From 1993 to 1995, Zhou created and produced the shows Masters of Chinese Art, Masters of Arts and Crafts, and Chinese Scholars. People featured in these shows included the artists Zhu Qizhan and Wu Zuoren, masters such as Gao Gongbo and Li Bosheng, and scholars like Ji Xianlin and Fei Xiaotong. Zhou also produced about a hundred episodes of Oriental Sons. Oriental Sons featured people such as Bing Xin and Chen-Ning Yang.
 In August 1995, Zhou directed and produced China's first series of experimental programs for "Representation of Reality", called Unforgettable.
 In 1996, he served as Writer-Director of a full-length documentary called Zhou Enlai. This documentary was awarded the Special Award of Documentary Academic Committee, Five-One Project Awards and Special Awards from China TV Golden Eagle Awards.
 In 1997, Zhou directed Mei Lanfang 1930. Starting from this program, he began producing documentaries of people through “representation of reality” as the major film and television exploring means. He also tried producing TV programs by cinematic techniques and operation modes. This program won the Second Level Award from Chinese Documentary Academic Committee.
 In July 1999, Zhou served as the Chief Writer-Director of Memories, a full-length documentary jointly produced by Oriental Time and Space and China Television Media Co. Ltd.
 Zhou sorted prominent Chinese figures of the 20th century and produced them into television programs, including 30 historical and cultural celebrities such as Huang Xing, Cai E, Lu Xun, Mei Lanfang, Liang Sicheng, Shen Congwen, A Bing, Yan Yangchu, Soong Ching-ling (also Song Qingling), and Lu Zuofu. These TV programs received positive responses both from the TV theory field and the public audiences after broadcasting. In September 2000, Zhou worked as the producer of Oriental Time and Space and Chronicle. During this time, he planned and organized the broadcasting of over a hundred episodes of documentaries.
 In May 2002, Zhou was in charge of planning, organizing and hosting a large academic activity, "Review and Screen the Past Two Decades of Chinese TV Documentary." Some comments said that this meeting was one of the 'Top 3 Meetings of Chinese TV Documentary in Two Decades.' In the same year, he acted as the keynote speaker at a Report Meeting of CCTV's Research Projects hosted by the Research Bureau of CCTV's Chief Editing Office.
 In May 2003, Zhou served as the chief director of Imperial Palace, a full-length documentary. This was the first time that the Imperial Palace fully and openly cooperated with CCTV, and was a prominently large-scale television production through jointly and solidly sorting China's history, culture, and art.
 In 2004, Zhou planned a full-length documentary called War of Resistance. His documentary won numerous awards, including Best Full-length Documentary and Best Cinematography in the category of Humanity and Social Class from the International “Gold Panda” Awards, and Best Writer-Director and Best Cinematography of the 23rd China TV “Golden Eagle.” The documentary was also rated as Best Writing and Top 10 Documentaries of China TV.
 In 2005, Zhou directed the full-length documentary Mei Lanfang. Mei Lanfang was nominated as a Top 10 Documentary and won Academy Award.
 In 2005, Zhou also served as Chief Director of Dunhuang, a full-length documentary. Dunhuang won Special Jury Award of Golden Panda in the category of humanity class in 2009 and First Level Award of Program for Documenting China 2009.
 In 2006, Zhou acted as Producer and Art Director for KunQu. KunQu won Outstanding Documentary Award of 24th China TV Golden Eagle Awards.
 During the period from 2005 to 2007, Zhou took part in the joint production of the international edition of The Imperial Palace, whose name became Decoding of The Forbidden City. It was broadcast in 26 languages among 164 countries in the world, with 290 million families watching.
 In 2007, Zhou served as one of the Chief directors of When the Louvre Meets the Forbidden City. This was the first time the Louvre Museum opened its gate to Chinese film crews at such a large scale. When the Louvre Meets the Forbidden City won the Top Ten Documentaries Award, and has been named as an Official Selection of the Second Annual Macao, China International Digital Cinema Festivals film competition.
 The Documentary Dunhuang, with Zhou as the Chief Director, was introduced and broadcast by the main media in places such as Japan, Thailand, Hong Kong and Taiwan.
 The documentary The Bund, directed by Zhou, was officially released by CCTV in 2010. Transcending the traditional form of the documentaries, the film not only showed the life in previous Shanghai through recreating the scenes, but also invited celebrities to talk about the vicissitudes of the bund. The film premiered at the Shanghai International Film Festival and aired on the National Geographic Channel. Instead of elaborating on a straight historical timeline of the Bund, the movie is divided into four acts. The first three explore the lives of six individuals, and the last act concludes how their fates have been associated with the ups and downs of the Bund. The film was as appraised to be one of the Classic Works of China TV Documentaries by China Television Artists’ Association, and was also awarded the Special Award of the Outstanding TV Documentaries, and the 29th Session of the “Star and Flower Prize” of the Central New Pictures Group.
 In 2010, Zhou lead the team of The Forbidden City to once again produce a full-length high-definition documentary - A Century with Cars. It was released by CCTV10. A Century with Cars is a full-length documentary on the car and an epic on the evolution of human society. The 12-episode full-length HD TV program was the first film in China regarding the 100-year development history of cars as a clue, reflecting the endeavor of mankind for the ideals. The film was awarded the second prize of the “Record· China” Excellence Comment by China Radio and Television Association.
 At the end of 2013, historical and cultural documentary South of the Ocean, directed by Zhou, was broadcast on CCTV. The shooting of this documentary lasted for five years, and nearly 20,000 minutes of materials were captured in it, showing the development experiences of Chinese people in the Southeast Asian countries and their lives in different periods.  South of the Ocean was first shown on the United States History Channel (with coverage in Southeast Asia), and received numerous praise in Southeast Asia. In the ceremony of the "Golden Kapok Award" during the 2013 Guangzhou International Documentary Film Festival, South of the Ocean was awarded the Best Documentary Series Program.
 In 2015, Snow Leopard, a documentary, was played in CCTV-9 Documentary Channel, it was a scheme for natural environment for the first transition of Zhou, the general director who was skilled in human history documentary and made contact with the animal that was the most uncooperative with the shoot. It was awarded as the first prize of the excellence creation review & appraisal (nature) item of the 9th session of "Records. China" by China Alliance of Radio, Film, and Television.
 In 2017, Understanding Asia China: The Legacy Of Cixi'' directed by Zhou was released on the NewsAsia Channel. Through the eyes of Cixi, the episode examines the influences that have shaped the Chinese people's characteristics through the historical stories of Cixi - the Empress Dowager of the last Chinese dynasty.

Filmography

Published Works

Awards

References 

5.< Nanyang odyssey> -China Daily Asia

9.I Love Documentary: Interview of Director ZHOU Bing

Chinese documentary film directors
1968 births
Living people